Andrey Makarov (born 20 April 1993) is a Russian professional ice hockey goaltender. He played one game in the National Hockey League (NHL) for the Buffalo Sabres.

Playing career
Makarov played major junior hockey with both the Lewiston Maineiacs of the QMJHL and the Saskatoon Blades of the WHL. He also played with the Russia men's national junior ice hockey team at both the 2012 and 2013 World Junior Ice Hockey Championships, winning silver and bronze respectively. On 14 September 2012, the Buffalo Sabres of the National Hockey League (NHL) signed Makarov as an undrafted free agent to a three-year entry-level contract, but assigned him to continue his play in the WHL with the Saskatoon Blades. Playing with the Blades during the 2012–13 season, Makarov was awarded the Hap Emms Memorial Trophy as the most outstanding goaltender at the 2013 Memorial Cup. In 115 career WHL games with Saskatoon, Makarov went 66-38-7 with a .916 save percentage, a 2.80 goals against average (GAA), and nine shutouts.

Makarov made his professional debut on 1 November 2013 with the Fort Wayne Komets of the ECHL where he played 31 games during the 2013–14 season to post a record of 15-11-4 with a .906 save percentage and a 2.79 GAA. He was recalled to the Rochester Americans of the American Hockey League (AHL) on 17 March 2014, where he played 6 games before receiving his first NHL call-up, on 8 April 2014, to join the roster of the Buffalo Sabres.

Makarov opted to leave for the Kontinental Hockey League (KHL) for the 2016–17 season. Among the factors for his decision to leave the Sabres organization was that he believed Tim Murray, the Sabres' general manager, held a bias against Russian players; Makarov noted that, at the time of his departure, he was the only Russian in the Sabres' entire farm system, after Murray had traded away fellow Russians Mikhail Grigorenko and Nikita Zadorov. Makarov signed a two-year deal with HC Spartak Moscow.

Before appearing in a game with CSKA, Makarov was acquired by Chinese entrant, HC Kunlun Red Star on 5 July 2017. He appeared in their inaugural season, posting a .912 save percentage in 29 games in the 2016–17 regular season. On 10 May 2017, Makarov was returned to CSKA before he was swiftly traded to HC Neftekhimik Nizhnekamsk in exchange for financial compensation.

In his second season with Nizhnekamsk in 2018–19, earning just one win in six games, Makarov left the club to sign with Avtomobilist Yekaterinburg on 23 November 2018.

Career statistics

Regular season and playoffs

Awards and honours

References

External links
 

1993 births
Living people
Avtomobilist Yekaterinburg players
Buffalo Sabres players
Buran Voronezh players
Dinamo Riga players
Fort Wayne Komets players
HC Kunlun Red Star players
Lewiston Maineiacs players
HC Neftekhimik Nizhnekamsk players
Sportspeople from Kazan
Rochester Americans players
Russian ice hockey goaltenders
Saskatoon Blades players
Undrafted National Hockey League players
HC Slovan Bratislava players
Russian expatriate ice hockey people
Russian expatriate sportspeople in the United States
Russian expatriate sportspeople in Canada
Russian expatriate sportspeople in China
Russian expatriate sportspeople in Latvia
Russian expatriate sportspeople in Slovakia
Russian expatriate sportspeople in Ukraine
Expatriate ice hockey players in Slovakia
Expatriate ice hockey players in China
Expatriate ice hockey players in Canada
Expatriate ice hockey players in Latvia
Expatriate ice hockey players in the United States
Expatriate ice hockey players in Ukraine